Yamuna Prasad Mandal born in a yadav family of bihar. He was an Indian politician belonging to the Indian National Congress. He was elected to the lower House of the Indian Parliament the Lok Sabha from Jainagar (Bihar State) in 1962, and then from Samastipur  in Bihar in 1967 and 1971.

References

External links
Official biographical sketch in Parliament of India website

India MPs 1962–1967
India MPs 1967–1970
India MPs 1971–1977
Lok Sabha members from Bihar
Indian National Congress politicians
1910 births
Year of death missing